World Book Day is a charity event held annually in the United Kingdom and Ireland on the first Thursday in March. On World Book Day, every child in full-time education in the UK and the Republic of Ireland is provided with a voucher to be spent on books; the event was first celebrated in the United Kingdom in 1998. 

The event is the local manifestation of the original, global World Book Day organized by UNESCO to promote reading, publishing, and copyright, and widely observed on 23 April. Organizers in the UK moved the observance to avoid clashes with Easter school holidays and with Saint George's Day. Book publishers in Ireland decided to bring World Book Day to Ireland a number of years later. 

Conversely, the World Book Night event organized by independent charity The Reading Agency is held on 23 April.

History

The United Kingdom's own version of World Book Day began in 1998, launched by Prime Minister Tony Blair at the Globe Theatre in London. Several million schoolchildren in the UK were given a special £1 World Book Day Book Token which could be redeemed against any book in any UK bookshop. A specially created WBD anthology priced at £1 was also published. All World Book Day point of sale and the £1 book carried the special World Book Day logo to help unify the initiative through all outlets.

Since then, World Book Day UK has followed a similar pattern, gradually growing each year to encompass more initiatives, such as Spread The Word, Quick Reads Initiative and Books for Hospitals. Every year, the number of children receiving a World Book Day Book Token has increased.

In 2000, instead of a single £1 special anthology, four separate £1 books were published, covering a wider age-range.  Since then, each year has seen a new set of special £1 books published.

In 2006, World Book Day began its support of and association with the Quick Reads initiative for adult emergent readers.

In 2007, World Book Day celebrated its 10th anniversary with the publication of 10 £1/1,50€ books. Since then every child in full-time education in the UK and Ireland is entitled to receive a £1/1,50€ World Book day Book token every year. They can swap their WBD token for one of specially-produced WBD books or they can get £1/€1 off a full-price book or audio book priced £2.99 or euro equivalent.

Administration
World Book Day is a registered charity. It does not raise funds for itself but does support Book Aid International and Readathon as its nominated charities, encouraging schools to hold special fundraising events for children less fortunate than themselves. World Book Day is not funded by the British Government although the Quick Reads element does receive support from ACE, DIUS and NIACE. The funding for World Book Day activities comes principally from the major sponsor, National Book Tokens and the UK book trade (publishers and booksellers).

References

External links
Official site

Programmes of the Government of the United Kingdom
Reading (process)
March observances
1995 establishments in the United Kingdom
Recurring events established in 1995
Annual events in Ireland
Annual events in the United Kingdom
Charity events in the United Kingdom
Thursday observances
Holidays and observances by scheduling (nth weekday of the month)